Xiaguan, formerly romanized as Hsiakwan, is a subdistrict at the southern end of Erhai Lake in Dali Prefecture, Yunnan, China. Xiaguan has a population of 146,517 (2020) and is the modern centre of the county-level city of Dali.

Xiaguan has been the principal point of entry for the region since the creation of the Burma Road and has become the major city and industrial centre of the county.  As with most county seats in China, Xiaguan is often referred to by the county name, "Dali".  To distinguish it from the county's eponymous Dali Town, it is sometimes called "New Dali" or "Dali New Town".

Transportation
Xiaguan is connected to Kunming and Myanmar by the Hangrui Expressway (G56), with Lijiang by the Dali Expressway (G56₁₁), and with Dali's old town by Hwy 214.

See also
Dali City

References

Township-level divisions of Dali Bai Autonomous Prefecture
Towns of Yunnan